Shahin Shafiei (born December 30, 1988, in Iran) is an Iranian footballer who currently plays for Foolad in the Iran Pro League.

See also
2008–09 Saba Qom F.C. season
2009–10 Damash Gilan F.C. season
List of Iranian football transfers summer 2010

References

External links
teamfantasy.varzesh3.com Profile Team Fantasy
bushehrnews.com Bushehr News

Profile at Soccerway

1988 births
Iranian footballers
Living people
Shahin Bushehr F.C. players
Shahin Shafiei
Association football midfielders